Ituu is one of clan of the Oromo people. This  group lives dominantly in the present-day West Hararghe Zone. The correct term for the land of Ituus is "Chercher" or "Ona Ituu" (the Ituu Province). It is believed the extinct Harla ethnicity were incorporated into Ituu Oromo.

Ituus are divided into ten clans: Baye, Wayye, Addayyo, Aroji, Babo, Gadula, Wachale, Alga, Gamo, Qalu, but there is no Galan in Ituu.

Culture 
The Ituu are sedentary farmers. Majority of the Ituu are adherents of Sunni Islam.

References

Oromo groups